As Good as Dead may refer to:

As Good as Dead (album), an album by American rock band Local H
As Good as Dead (1995 film), a 1995 thriller television film directed by Larry Cohen
As Good as Dead (2010 film), a 2010 crime thriller film